Josef ("Josi") Singer (יוסף זינגר; August 24, 1923 – November 12, 2009) is a former president and professor of Technion – Israel Institute of Technology.

Biography
Singer was born in Vienna. He and his family immigrated to Haifa, Israel in 1933 when he was 10 years old, and he served for three years as a pilot with Britain's Royal Air Force during World War II.

He completed his education at Imperial College London, and the Polytechnic Institute of Brooklyn.

Singer was the President of Technion from 1982 to 1986. He replaced Amos Horev as President, and was in turn succeeded by Max Reis.

He was the recipient of the Israel Prize in 2000 for his lifetime achievement in the field of aeronautical engineering.

Awards
Wilhelm Exner Medal (1994).
Israel Prize (2000).

See also
List of presidents of the Technion

References

Polytechnic Institute of New York University alumni
Academic staff of Technion – Israel Institute of Technology
Scientists from Vienna
Israeli aerospace engineers
Alumni of Imperial College London
New York University alumni
Royal Air Force airmen
Austrian emigrants to Mandatory Palestine
1923 births
2009 deaths